Wayna Tawqaray (Quechua wayna young, young man, tawqaray heap, pile, also spelled Wayna Taucaray) is an archaeological site in Peru. It is located in the Cusco Region, Cusco Province, San Sebastián District, about 5 km southeast of the center of Cusco. The mountain with the archaeological remains lies southeast of the mountain Araway Qhata and the hill Muyu Urqu, above the river Watanay.

See also 
 Inkill Tampu
 Pumamarka
 Rumiwasi
 Wanakawri

References

 buenastareas.com Wayna Taucaray (in Spanish)

Archaeological sites in Cusco Region
Archaeological sites in Peru